Bob Bryan and Mike Bryan were the defending champions but lost in the second round to Aisam-ul-Haq Qureshi and Jean-Julien Rojer.
Mariusz Fyrstenberg and Marcin Matkowski won the tournament defeating Robert Lindstedt and Horia Tecău 6–3, 6–4 in the final.

Seeds
The top eight seeds receive a bye into the second round.

Draw

Finals

Top half

Bottom half

References
 Main Draw

Men's Doubles